William Henry Tobey (1799 Hudson, Columbia County, New York – May 1878) was an American lawyer, banker and politician from New York.

Life
He studied law, was admitted to the bar in 1820, and practiced in New Lebanon. He was a member of the New York State Assembly (Columbia Co.) in 1838; Surrogate of Columbia County from 1841 to 1845; and a member of the New York State Senate (11th D.) in 1862 and 1863.

He was a Director of the National Bank of Kinderhook from 1839; and President of the National Union Bank of Kinderhook from 1853 until his death.

Sources
 The New York Civil List compiled by Franklin Benjamin Hough, Stephen C. Hutchins and Edgar Albert Werner (1870; pg. 265, 315 and 443)
 Biographical Sketches of the State Officers and the Members of the Legislature of the State of New York in 1862 and '63 by William D. Murphy (1863; pg. 111ff)
 The New York State Register by Roger Sherman Skinner (1830; pg. 157)
 The Village of Kinderhook by Capt. Franklin Ellis, transcribed at US Gen Net

1799 births
1878 deaths
New York (state) state senators
People from Hudson, New York
New York (state) Republicans
Members of the New York State Assembly
New York (state) Whigs
19th-century American politicians
American bankers
New York (state) state court judges
19th-century American judges
19th-century American businesspeople